The 2017–18 Louisiana Ragin' Cajuns men's basketball team represented the University of Louisiana at Lafayette during the 2017–18 NCAA Division I men's basketball season. The Ragin' Cajuns were led by eighth-year head coach Bob Marlin and played their home games at the Cajundome as members in the Sun Belt Conference. They finished the season 27–7, 16–2 in Sun Belt play to win the Sun Belt regular season championship. The conference championship was the school's first since first regular-season title since sharing the 2000 title and its first outright title since joining the conference in 1991. They defeated Texas State in the quarterfinals of the Sun Belt tournament before losing in the semifinals to Texas–Arlington. As a regular season conference champion who failed to win their conference tournament, they received an automatic bid to the National Invitation Tournament where they lost in the first round to LSU.

Head coach Bob Marlin sparked controversy after it was announced that the Cajuns would play in-state rival LSU in the NIT, believing the Cajuns were the better team and should have been given home-court advantage. He also said of LSU, "Sometimes, a team that tied for ninth in their league isn’t interested in playing. But they haven’t been very good for a couple of years, so the NIT is a big step for them." Late in the game, which LSU won, Marlin and LSU head coach Will Wade had to be restrained while yelling at each other.

Previous season 
The Ragin' Cajuns finished the 2016–17 season 21–12, 10–8 in Sun Belt play to finish in a three-way tie for sixth place. They defeated Little Rock in the first round of the Sun Belt tournament before losing to Georgia State in the quarterfinals. They did not participate in a postseason tournament.

Offseason

Departures

Incoming recruits

Roster

Schedule and results

|-
!colspan=12 style=| Exhibition

|-
!colspan=12 style=| Non-conference regular season

|-
!colspan=9 style=| Sun Belt regular season

|-
!colspan=12 style=| Sun Belt tournament

|-
!colspan=9 style=| NIT

References 

Louisiana Ragin' Cajuns men's basketball seasons
Louisiana-Lafayette
Louisiana
Louisiana
Louisiana